Death Triangle is a professional wrestling stable in All Elite Wrestling (AEW) consisting of Pac and The Lucha Brothers (Penta El Zero Miedo and Rey Fénix), alongside their manager Alex Abrahantes  The trio are former AEW World Trios Champions. Additionally, since the team's formation in March 2020, The Lucha Brothers became one-time AEW World Tag Team Champions, while Pac and Fénix won the 2021 Casino Tag Team Royale.

History

All Elite Wrestling (2020–present)

On the March 4, 2020, episode of Dynamite, Pac formed a villainous alliance with The Lucha Brothers (Penta El Zero Miedo and Rey Fénix) called Death Triangle, attacking Orange Cassidy and Best Friends (Chuck Taylor and Trent). Pac would become absent from AEW television soon after as he was unable to travel due to the COVID-19 pandemic. During this absence, Alex Abrahantes became the manager of The Lucha Brothers. After an eight-month absence from television, Pac returned to AEW on the November 11 episode of Dynamite where he confronted Eddie Kingston, thus turning face for the first time since 2016. On the following episode of Dynamite, Death Triangle was reformed after Fénix and Penta saved Pac from an attack by Kingston and The Butcher and The Blade.

At Revolution on March 7, 2021, Pac and Fénix won the Casino Tag Team Battle Royale to determine the next challengers for the AEW World Tag Team Championship. They challenged The Young Bucks (Matt Jackson and Nick Jackson) for the tag team championship on the April 14 episode of Dynamite, but were defeated. This match was awarded a five-star rating from wrestling journalist Dave Meltzer of the Wrestling Observer Newsletter. On September 5 at All Out, Penta and Fénix defeated The Young Bucks in a tornado tag team steel cage match to win the AEW World Tag Team Championship. At Full Gear, the duo successfully defended their titles against FTR (Cash Wheeler and Dax Harwood). On the TBS debut episode of Dynamite on January 5, 2022, Penta and Fénix lost the AEW World Tag Team Championship to Jurassic Express (Jungle Boy and Luchasaurus), ending their reign at 122 days. During the match, Fénix was chokeslammed off the apron through a table by Luchasaurus, which dislocated his left elbow upon landing. 

On the February 23 episode of Dynamite, Pac teamed with Penta, who was now using the name "Penta Oscuro", to defeat Kings of the Black Throne (Brody King and Malakai Black). During Revolution's Buy-In pre-show, Pac and Penta would team with Erick Redbeard in a trios match against the House of Black (King, Black, and Buddy Matthews), which they lost. Fénix returned from injury on the April 27 episode of Dynamite, disguised as manager Alex Abrahantes, before attacking the House of Black and reuniting with the rest of Death Triangle. At Double or Nothing, Death Triangle lost to the House of Black in a six-man tag team match after interference by Julia Hart. At AEW x NJPW: Forbidden Door, Pac defeated Malakai Black, Miro, and Clark Connors in a fatal four-way match to become the inaugural AEW All-Atlantic Champion. 

After Forbidden Door, Death Triangle competed in a tournament to crown the inaugural AEW World Trios Champions, but were eliminated in the first round by United Empire (Will Ospreay and Aussie Open (Mark Davis and Kyle Fletcher)). However, after the championship was vacated on the September 7 episode of Dynamite, Death Triangle defeated Best Friends that same episode to win the vacant Trios Championship, which also made Pac a double champion.

Championships and accomplishments 

 All Elite Wrestling
AEW All-Atlantic Championship (1 time) – Pac
 AEW World Tag Team Championship (1 time) – Penta and Fénix
AEW World Trios Championship (1 time)
AEW All-Atlantic Championship Tournament (2022) – Pac
 AEW World Tag Team Championship Eliminator Tournament (2021) – Penta and Fénix
 Casino Tag Team Royale (2021) – Pac and Fénix
Dynamite Award (1 time)
 Best Tag Team Brawl (2022) – 
 Pro Wrestling Illustrated
 Ranked No. 4 of the top 50 Tag Teams in the PWI Tag Team 50 in 2022

See also
Lucha Brothers

References 

All Elite Wrestling teams and stables